The 1884 Chicago Browns/Pittsburgh Stogies finished with a 41–50 record (34–39 while in Chicago, 7–11 while in Allegheny City) in the Union Association, finishing in sixth place. This was the only season the team existed, and indeed the only season the Union Association existed. 

The team moved from Chicago to Allegheny City (today a part of Pittsburgh's North Shore) after their game of August 22.  The team folded completely after their game of September 18, which was about a month before the 1884 season was scheduled to be over. With the Wilmington Quicksteps also having folded on September 21, and with about a dozen games remaining to be played, for the final games of the season the two defunct teams were replaced by teams from Milwaukee and St. Paul.

Regular season

Season standings

Record vs. opponents

Opening Day lineup

Roster

Player stats

Batting

Starters by position 
Note: Pos = Position; G = Games played; AB = At bats; H = Hits; Avg. = Batting average; HR = Home runs

Other batters 
Note: G = Games played; AB = At bats; H = Hits; Avg. = Batting average; HR = Home runs

Pitching

Starting pitchers 
Note: G = Games pitched; IP = Innings pitched; W = Wins; L = Losses; ERA = Earned run average; SO = Strikeouts

Other pitchers 
Note: G = Games pitched; IP = Innings pitched; W = Wins; L = Losses; ERA = Earned run average; SO = Strikeouts

Relief pitchers 
Note: G = Games pitched; W = Wins; L = Losses; SV = Saves; ERA = Earned run average; SO = Strikeouts

References 
 1884 Chicago Browns/Pittsburgh Stogies team page at Baseball Reference

Chicago Browns Pittsburgh Stogies season